BW-723C86 is a tryptamine derivative drug which acts as a 5-HT2B receptor agonist. It has anxiolytic effects in animal studies, and is also used for investigating the function of the 5-HT2B receptor in a range of other tissues.

BW-723C86 is actually a mixed 5-HT2B/5-HT2C agonist, and while it has good selectivity over 5-HT2A and other serotonin receptor subtypes, it is around only 3 times as selective for 2B compared to 2C and so is much less selective than most research ligands, but no superior 5-HT2B agonist was available until the potent and selective 5-HT2B activity of 6-APB was discovered in 2012. Highly selective 5-HT2C antagonists are available however, and so a combination of BW-723C86 with a selective 5-HT2C antagonist allows 5-HT2B mediated responses to be studied in isolation.

An in vitro study including assay on normal (healthy) human melanocytes found that BW-723C86 causes skin whitening. The mechanism of action of BW-723C86 is decreasing the expression of MITF which in turn, decreases the expression of the melanin main synthesizing enzymes: tyrosinase, TRP-1 and TRP-2. BW-723C86 is not cytotoxic to melanocytes and, unlike many skin whitening agents, does not directly inhibit the activity of tyrosinase.

See also 
 5-Benzyloxytryptamine

Notes

References 

5-HT2B agonists
Tryptamines
Serotonin receptor agonists
Indole ethers at the benzene ring
Thiophenes